The Garden State Bowl was an annual post-season college football bowl game played at Giants Stadium in East Rutherford, New Jersey, from 1978 until 1981. Freezing temperatures each year at the game, together with a lack of successful local college teams, contributed to its rapid demise.

Game results

Garden State Bowl Broadcasters

Television

Effects
After the demise of the Garden State Bowl following the 1981 game, the New Jersey Sports and Exposition Authority, which operated and scheduled events at Giants Stadium, decided to host a game in the beginning of the season, rather than the end.  This led to the formation of the Kickoff Classic, which was held either the last week of August or the first week of September every year for 20 seasons.

See also
List of college bowl games
Kickoff Classic

References

 
Defunct college football bowls
American football in New Jersey
Recurring sporting events established in 1978
Recurring sporting events disestablished in 1981
1978 establishments in New Jersey
1981 disestablishments in New Jersey